Baja Oklahoma is a 1988 American made-for-television comedy-drama film by HBO Original Film starring Lesley Ann Warren.  Written by director Bobby Roth and novelist Dan Jenkins, based on Jenkins's 1982 novel with the same title, it also stars Peter Coyote, Swoosie Kurtz, and Julia Roberts. The title song was written by Jenkins and Willie Nelson, who appears as himself near the end of the film to sing it with Warren.

Plot
Juanita Hutchins has dreams of becoming a country-western music songwriter, but she works at a bar in the meantime.

Cast

Other
"Baja Oklahoma" is a nickname for Texas.

References

External links

1988 television films
1988 films
1980s English-language films
Films directed by Bobby Roth
Films scored by Stanley Myers
Films set in Texas
Films based on American novels
HBO Films films
Country music films